Tormiston Mill is a Category B listed watermill located on the Mainland of Orkney, in Scotland, adjacent to Maeshowe. It is a fine example of a water wheel that was probably built in the 1880s, and the mechanisms have been preserved as a museum. The mill is a large, rectangular building with three floors. It was powered by three pairs of grinding stones driven by a cast iron waterwheel  Because of the building's close proximity to Maeshowe, the building is used as the ticket office and gift shop of Maeshowe. While visitors wait for Maeshowe, via the timed ticket tours, they can explore and look at the museum at Tormiston Mill. The mill also has some exhibits about the mill and the area. It is owned by Historic Scotland.

References

Historic Scotland properties in Orkney
1884 establishments in Scotland
Industrial buildings completed in 1885
Watermills in Scotland
Category B listed buildings in Orkney
Listed industrial buildings in Scotland
Mainland, Orkney